Dax Jordan is an American actor and standup comedian. He was born and lives in Los Angeles, California and was raised in Sandy, Oregon.

Standup comedy 

Jordan has performed as a stand up comedian since 2005, appearing several times at the Bridgetown Comedy Festival in Portland, Oregon. He placed third in the 2010 Seattle International Comedy Competition.

Jordan was also the celebrity host for the awards ceremony of the first annual SymmyS Awards for outstanding palindrome achievement in 2013. The judges for the event included Jordan's inspiration, "Weird Al" Yankovic as well as comedians Demetri Martin and Jackie Kashian, musician John Flansburgh of They Might Be Giants, and New York Times crossword puzzle editor Will Shortz.

Acting 
Jordan has appeared in several movies including Untraceable, Freedom State, and Skyn Deep. He shot and directed the short film Who the F*ck is Chip Seinfeld?, which was later expanded into a feature mockumentary by the filmmaker Mike Newman.

References

External links 
 
 
 Dax Jordan videos at Rooftop Comedy.com
 2008 Bridgetown Comedy Festival highlights
 The short film Who the F*ck is Chip Seinfeld?

Living people
Comedians from Oregon
People from Los Angeles
Year of birth missing (living people)